Katolikus Ifjúsági Mozgalom (KIM) (in English: "Catholic Youth Movement") is a Hungarian Roman Catholic youth organization. KIM is observing member of the Youth Commission of the Hungarian Catholic Bishops’ Conference. At international level KIM is an observer member of the Catholic umbrella of youth organizations Fimcap.

History 
 1989: KIM was founded after the political changes in 1989 and is one of the oldest non-governmental organizations in Hungary.

See also 
 György Bulányi

References

Catholic youth organizations
Youth organisations based in Hungary
Fimcap
Catholic Church in Hungary